Memelas are fried or toasted cakes made of masa topped with different fresh ingredients eaten as antojitos or snacks in the states of Guerrero, Oaxaca and Puebla, Mexico which has its origins in prehispanic food. They are similar to fresh corn tortillas, but are slightly thicker and usually oblong/oval in shape. Memela is the local name for the almost identical sope and huarache served in other parts of Mexico, but with different toppings.

The corn masa is flattened with a tortilla press, pinched to create indentations along its borders, then placed over a hot comal or griddle. When the tortilla-like base is cooked and charred where the dough hits the hot metal of the grill and becomes as chewy as a medium-well steak, it is then topped with black beans, salsa, shredded cabbage, mole negro, guacamole, and cheese.

Although the traditional memela is supposed to be topped with no other additional ingredients, those toppings now vary from recipe to recipe. Modern incarnations include other vegetables and the option of a layer of tinga (shredded chicken with tomatoes, onions, and chiles) or potatoes and sausage.

Memelas have been served at Oaxacan/Mexican restaurants in the United States since the 1990s.

Other varieties
In El Salvador, a memela is a thick and oval shaped tortilla.

In Honduras and Guatemala, a memela is a toasted cake made of masa mixed with cinnamon and curdle, cooked in banana leaves.

See also
 Tlayuda
 List of Mexican dishes

References

Oaxacan cuisine
Mesoamerican cuisine
Pancakes
Maize dishes